Hypasura is a monotypic moth genus in the subfamily Arctiinae. Its single species, Hypasura hoenei, is found in Hunan, China. Both the genus and species were first described by Franz Daniel in 1952.

References

External links 

Lithosiini